At the 1932 Summer Olympics, seven fencing events were contested.

Medal summary

Men's events

Women's events

Medal table

Participating nations
A total of 108 fencers (91 men, 17 women) from 16 nations competed at the Los Angeles Games: Cuba had fencers entered, but none competed.

References

 
1932 Summer Olympics events
1932
1932 in fencing
International fencing competitions hosted by the United States